Accra kikuayana is a species of moth of the family Tortricidae. It is found in Kenya and
Nigeria.

The wingspan is about 14 mm. The ground colour of the forewings is greyish green and the costa and termen are ochreous, as well as an edge and row of blackish dots along the apex. The markings are red.

References

Moths described in 2005
Tortricini
Moths of Africa